Lagwal Minhasan is a village located in Narowal District, Punjab, Pakistan.

Villages in Narowal District